Antoninus is a Latin masculine given name. It may refer to:

Roman people
Antoninus (philosopher), Neoplatonist philosopher of the 4th century
Antoninus (turncoat), Roman who joined the Sassanid Empire and assisted Shapur II in the siege of Amida
Antoninus Liberalis, Greek grammarian who lived between the first and third centuries AD
Antoninus Pius (86–161), Roman emperor from 138 to 161
Gaius Arrius Antoninus, 2nd century Roman senator
Gnaeus Arrius Antoninus (born AD 31), maternal grandfather of Antoninus Pius
Honoratus Antoninus, 5th century Roman Catholic Bishop
Lucius Caesennius Antoninus (c. 95 – after 128), Roman aristocrat and consul
Marcus Aurelius Antoninus, several emperors with the same regnal name
Quintus Haterius Antoninus, 1st century Roman consul

See also

 William Everson (poet), also known as Brother Antoninus, (1912 – 1994), American poet
Saint Antoninus (disambiguation), several saints with the same name

 Antonius, nomen of the gens Antonia, one of the most important plebeian families at Rome
 Antonin (disambiguation)